Hatfield Peverel is a village and civil parish at the centre of Essex, England.  It is located 6 miles (10 km) north-east from Chelmsford, the nearest large city, to which it is connected by road and rail. The parish includes the hamlets of Nounsley and Mowden. Hatfield means a 'heathery space in the forest'; Peverel refers to William Peverel, the Norman knight granted lands in the area by William the Conqueror after the Norman invasion of 1066. Sited on high ground east of the River Ter, between Boreham and Witham on the A12, it is situated in the southern extremity of the Braintree District Council area (to which it elects two members). In 2020, the built-up area subdivision had an estimated population of 3,226. In 2011, the built-up area which includes Nounsley had a population of 3,950 and the parish had a population of 4,376.

Hatfield Peverel is the site of a priory founded by the Saxon Ingelrica, wife of Ranulph Peverel and reputed to be the mistress of William the Conqueror, to atone for her sins, and dissolved by Henry VIII.

Local amenities

The parish church, St Andrew's (Church of England) is the surviving fragment of the Norman priory church nave. There is also a Methodist Church and a Salvation Army (north-east London headquarters) congregation. 

The village has a junior school, St. Andrew's C of E, and an adjacent infant school; Scout and Guide organisations, with headquarters in Church Road; a post office; a library; and a doctors' surgery.

Economy

Hatfield Peverel was the site of an Arla Foods factory which closed in July 2016; primarily, it used to produce dairy products.  The factory was subsequently demolished and there are plans to build up to 177 houses on the former site.  There are six public houses, a farm shop and other retail outlets. Main housing areas include Berwick Place, Crix, Hatfield Place, Hatfield Wick and The Priory.

Transport

Hatfield Peverel railway station is on the Great Eastern Main Line. It is served by Abellio Greater Anglia services from London Liverpool Street to Colchester and Ipswich.

The station is seen in the 1976 film Exposé starring Linda Hayden and Fiona Richmond, along with views of the surrounding countryside.

The village is served by First Essex's route 71 bus service which runs between Chelmsford and Colchester.

Sport

Hatfield Peverel Football Club has been established since 1903; it was originally based at the Duke of Wellington public house, before moving to the Recreation Ground in 1936.  The club are now based on the outskirts of the village at a former gravel pit at Wickham Bishops Road and fields men's, ladies' and junior teams.

Hatfield Peverel Cricket Club has been established since 1885. The club is based at the Church Road Ground, the club offers a range of teams: HPCC 1 XI (Mid Essex Cricket League), Friendly Teams - The Famous Allstars T20 team and HPCC Sunday XI.

Agnes Waterhouse

Hatfield Peverel was the home of Agnes Waterhouse, one of the first women to be executed for witchcraft in England. Known locally as Mother Waterhouse, and she confessed to witchcraft in 1566, and two other women were also accused of witchcraft at the same time: Elizabeth Francis and Joan Waterhouse (Agnes' daughter). Her trial took place in Chelmsford, where she was found guilty and executed for using witchcraft to disease and cause the death of William Fynne.

Elizabeth admitted to having a familiar - a cat called Satan, who she fed drops of her blood and it helped to kill people, terminate pregnancies and stole cattle. She sold the cat to Agnes in exchange for cake, and both Agnes and Joan tested the cat's abilities. Joan is said to have had the cat turn into a toad, and when a child refused to give Joan food, Satan offered to help Joan in exchange for her soul, which she agreed to. The toad was said to have harassed the child and threatened her with death, and eventually the child asked Satan who its 'dame' was, and it answered Agnes Waterhouse, leading her to be accused of witchcraft by the child.

Waterhouse was executed two days after the trial based on the evidence and word of the child.

References

External links

 Hatfield Peverel Online
 Hatfield Peverel
 http://www.pitchero.com/clubs/hatfieldpeverelfc
 https://wheatsheaf.net

 
Villages in Essex
Civil parishes in Essex
Braintree District